Espinosa is a barrio in the municipality of Dorado, Puerto Rico. Its population in 2010 was 4,534.

Sectors
Barrios (which are roughly comparable to minor civil divisions) in turn are further subdivided into smaller local populated place areas/units called sectores (sectors in English). The types of sectores may vary, from normally sector to urbanización to reparto to barriada to residencial, among others.

The following sectors are in Espinosa barrio:

, an elementary school was located in the Mavito sector of Espinosa barrio until its closure in 2018.

History
Puerto Rico was ceded by Spain in the aftermath of the Spanish–American War under the terms of the Treaty of Paris of 1898 and became an unincorporated territory of the United States. In 1899, the United States Department of War conducted a census of Puerto Rico finding that the population of Espinosa barrio was 787.

Drug trafficking has been an issue in Puerto Rico for many years and in early 1990, $43 million dollars in cash was found buried in plastic barrels, thought to have been deposited by drug smugglers for later retrieval. The sudden wealth of a few residents attracted attention and prompted an investigation by FBI and local police. By May 1990, the FBI had traced $11 million and seized and confiscated property and goods purchased with the money, which was said to belong to drug lord Ramon Torres Gonzalez. FBI stated the money was located on his farm in the Tiburón sector of Espinosa in Dorado and filed charges shortly after.

See also
 List of communities in Puerto Rico
 List of barrios and sectors of Dorado, Puerto Rico

References

External links

Barrios of Dorado, Puerto Rico